Zizipho Poswa (born ) is an artist and ceramicist based in Cape Town, South Africa.

Early life and education 
She studied textile design in college. She operates a studio called Imiso Ceramics with artist Andile Dyalvane. Imiso pots are carried by retailer Anthropologie.

Work 
Poswa's work expresses African womanhood and the role that Xhosa women play in contemporary life. She produces large-scale, hand-built sculptural pieces. Her iLobola series draws inspiration from the Xhosa rituals of lobola, or bride-wealth, the tradition of paying the bride's family with cattle. She has also drawn from the labor of rural women and traditional hairstyles.

Career 
Powsa has shown her work at Design Miami, Salon Art + Design, and Southern Guild gallery. Her work was included in the exhibition Before Yesterday We Could Fly at the Metropolitan Museum of Art.

Their works are in these collections: Metropolitan Museum of Art, Los Angeles County Museum of Art, Philadelphia Museum of Art.

References

External links 
Imiso Ceramics

South African contemporary artists
21st-century South African women artists
South African designers
South African ceramicists
South African women ceramicists
21st-century ceramists
Living people
1979 births
People from Mthatha
Xhosa people
Created via preloaddraft